Emirates Club Stadium is a multi-use stadium located in Ras al-Khaimah, United Arab Emirates.  It is currently used mostly for football matches and is the home ground of Emirates Club.  The stadium holds near 4,830 people.

References

Football venues in the United Arab Emirates
Emirates Club